The 1934–35 British Ice Hockey season consisted of English League and a Scottish League.

English League
The league in England was won by Streatham.

Scottish League
Bridge of Weir won the championship and received the Canada Cup.

Scores

(*Result was voided after Kelvingrove protested. **Bridge of Weir forfeited and the match was awarded to the Mohawks.)

Table

(Note: The last game of the year, played between Dennistoun and Mohawks on 4/30, was contested as an exhibition match, with no points awarded in the standings. Mohawks won 11-5. This accounts for the two teams having played one game less.)

Mitchell Trophy

Results

President's Pucks

Results

References 

British